Robledo de Chavela is a municipality in the Community of Madrid, Spain. It has a population of 3319.

The Madrid Deep Space Communication Complex (MDSCC) is located in this town.

References

See also 

 Imperial Route of the Community of Madrid

Municipalities in the Community of Madrid